"Velocity Girl" is a song by British alternative rock band Primal Scream, originally released as the B-side to their second single, "Crystal Crescent", in 1986. Shortly preceding its release, Primal Scream’s frontman, Bobby Gillespie, left his post as the drummer of The Jesus and Mary Chain, recording only one album with them, the influential noise pop release Psychocandy (1985). Disentangled from their major label "whirlwind", he resumed activity with the lesser known Primal Scream, proceeding to, as Pitchfork Media later described it, "reduce the pop song to its subatomic essence: quick, breezy, quirky, and above all, exquisitely small" with "Velocity Girl". The band also recorded a slightly longer version with a second verse for Janice Long in July 1986. The song was partly inspired by the actress, model and Warhol superstar Edie Sedgwick.

The NME magazine decided to include it as the first track on their C86 cassette later on in 1986, a collection of tracks from indie bands from British independent record labels. The cassette turned out to be very popular and influential, being later released as a separate, coupon-attained vinyl album and inspiring the nickname "C86" for mid-1980s indie pop music with an emphasis on jangle guitars.

Pitchfork Media said that "in pop music, 82 seconds can be an eternity. That’s how long Primal Scream’s “Velocity Girl” lasts, and the song was enough to have crystallized an entire era and established an undying narrative," noting that as C86s opening track, it "has become iconic", and "sounded humble, but it was not without ambition. It falls shy of the minute-and-half mark, and shyness can be heard in the song’s desperate refrain: “Leave me alone,” Gillespie pleads in a Glaswegian warble as guitars ring like chimes around him. It was the sound of soaring punk rock as filtered through the Byrds, and its expression of angry introversion— told in an almost Morrissey-esque manner, via the tale of a troubled, sensitive young woman— was only the first stage of evolution for Primal Scream", concluding that "Velocity Girl" "became C86’s signature song, and it’s the track that, more than any other on the tape, helped turn C86 from a comp into a genre." NME themselves later ranked it at number 90 in their list of the "100 Best Tracks of the Eighties", saying "it wasn’t just a key song in the C86 tape movement, it was a key moment in Primal Scream’s career", calling it "a great slice of vintage eighties jangle pop - a style and sound that the band would distance themselves from with Screamadelica, but from the teen-misfit of the title to the energized bolt of the music, this was a perfect moment of 80s indie Britpop." Allmusic said the song was the band's "early sound at its purest: a jangly rush of hyper-strummed guitars over an ultra-simple rhythm section behind Bobby Gillespie's charmingly naïve vocals."

The Song gained the number 4 position in the yearly John Peel festive fifty vote in 1986. It was the shortest song on the list that year.

The American indie band Velocity Girl took their name from the song. Welsh alternative rock band Manic Street Preachers covered the song in 1996 as the B-side to their single "Australia". It is also available on their B-sides collection Lipstick Traces (A Secret History of Manic Street Preachers).

In April 2019, the song was re-issued as a 7" single for Record Store Day. The release was accompanied with a new music video, directed by Douglas Hart.

PersonnelPrimal Scream'
Bobby Gillespie – lead vocals
Jim Beattie – lead guitar
Robert Young – bass guitar
Paul Harte – rhythm guitar
Thomas McGurk – drums
Martin St. John – tambourine

Charts

References

Primal Scream songs
1986 songs
Songs written by Bobby Gillespie
Jangle pop songs